The Arab Clubs Champions Championship is a sport competition for club volleyball teams, currently held annually and organized by the Arab Volleyball Association. the first edition was played in Libya in 1978.

Results

By Club

By Country

See also 

 Women's Arab volleyball clubs championship

External links
 Arab Clubs Champions Championship – goalzz.com
 Arab Clubs Champions Championship – abdogedeon.com 

International volleyball competitions
Volleyball in the Arab world
Multi-national professional sports leagues